Dan Louie Flores (born October 19, 1948) is an American writer and historian who specializes in cultural and environmental studies of the American West. He held the A.B. Hammond Chair in Western History at the University of Montana in Missoula, Montana until he retired in May 2014.

Background
Dan Flores is a writer who lives in the Galisteo Valley outside Santa Fe, New Mexico, and is A. B. Hammond Professor Emeritus of Western History at the University of Montana-Missoula. Flores was born in Vivian in Caddo Parish in northwestern Louisiana and grew up in nearby Rodessa. During the 1970s, he received his MA in history from Northwestern State University in Natchitoches, Louisiana, and his Ph.D. in 1978 from Texas A&M University in College Station, Texas, where he studied under Professor Herbert H. Lang. He began his academic career at Texas Tech University in Lubbock, where he taught from 1978 to 1992, spent a year at the University of Wyoming in 1986, and then relocated to the University of Montana, where he held the A.B. Hammond Chair in Western History from 1992 until he retired in May 2014.

Works

Books
Flores is the author of eleven books.
Wild New World: The Epic Story of Animals and People in America (New York: W.W. Norton, 2022).
 Coyote America: A Natural and Supernatural History (New York: Basic/Perseus, 2016)
 American Serengeti: The Last Big Animals of the Great Plains (Lawrence: University Press of Kansas, 2016)
 Visions of the Big Sky: Painting and Photographing the Northern Rocky Mountain West (Norman: University of Oklahoma Press, 2010)
 Caprock Canyonlands: Journeys into the Heart of the Southern Plains, 20th Anniversary Edition (College Station: Texas A&M University Press, 2010)
 The Natural West: Environmental History in the Great Plains and Rocky Mountains (Norman: University of Oklahoma Press, 2001; paperback edition, 2003)
 Southern Counterpart to Lewis & Clark: The Freeman & Custis Expedition of 1806 (Norman: University of Oklahoma Press, Red River Books paperback, 2nd edition, 2002)
 Horizontal Yellow: Nature and History in the Near Southwest (Albuquerque: University of New Mexico Press, 1999; paperback edition, 1999)
 The Mississippi Kite: Portrait of a Southern Hawk, with Eric Bolen (Austin: University of Texas Press, 1993)
 Caprock Canyonlands: Journeys into the Heart of the Southern Plains (Austin and London: University of Texas Press, 1990; paperback edition, 1997)
 Canyon Visions: Photographs and Pastels of the Texas Plains, with Amy Winton, Foreword by Larry McMurtry (Lubbock: Texas Tech University Press, 1989; paperback edition, 1989)
 Journal of an Indian Trader: Anthony Glass and the Texas Trading Frontier, 1790-1810 (College Station: Texas A&M University Press, 1985; paperback edition, 1998)
 Jefferson & Southwestern Exploration (Norman: University of Oklahoma Press, 1984; paperback edition, 1986)

Awards and honors
Flores' work has received numerous accolades and awards including:
Stubbendieck Great Plains Distinguished Book Prize, 2017, Winner, for American Serengeti
Society of American Historians Member, elected 2017.
2017 Sigurd F. Olson Nature Writing Award Winner for Coyote America
Best Non-Fiction Book, 2017 Wrangler Award Winner, Western Heritage Association and National Cowboy Museum, for American Serengeti
PEN 2017 E.O. Wilson Literary Science Writing Award Finalist for Coyote America: A Natural and Supernatural History 
Best Western Historical NonFiction, 2017, Finalist, Western Writers of America Spur Award, for American Serengeti

Critical reception
Flores' Wild New World has drawn praise as "An outstanding addition to the literature on the ecological history of America." For his Coyote America, Publisher's Weekly commended "Flores’s mix of edification and entertainment" as "a welcome antidote to a creature so often viewed with fear." While Thomas Andrews acknowledges “Flores’s longstanding expertise in the environmental history of the American West” and commends his “boundless respect, thoughtfulness, and good humor” in writing Coyote America. Historian Elliott West has called Flores "one of the most respected environmental historians of his generation" and William Kittredge concurs, stating that Flores belongs in "the ranks of first-string Western American writers."  "Engaging and provocative," "personal, passionate, and scholarly," Flores' work draws broad praise, including from author William deBuys, who calls Horizontal Yellow "one of the best books about place you'll ever read.".

Archives
Dan Flores' archives, research papers, and extensive photographs are housed in the Conservation Collection of the Western History and Genealogy Division of the Denver Public Library.

References

1948 births
Living people
People from Vivian, Louisiana
People from Natchitoches, Louisiana
21st-century American historians
American male non-fiction writers
Historians of the United States
Environmental historians
Historians of the American West
People from Lubbock, Texas
Writers from Missoula, Montana
Writers from Santa Fe, New Mexico
Northwestern State University alumni
Texas A&M University alumni
Texas Tech University faculty
University of Montana faculty
Historians from Texas
Historians from Louisiana
21st-century American male writers